The Forgotten Goddess is the debut album by the band Echoes of Eternity, released by Nuclear Blast records on February 2, 2007, in Europe and February 20, 2007, in the USA. It was produced by Eric Ryan, and recorded at Raven's Work studios in Venice, California.

Track list

 Burning with Life – 1:34
 Expressions of Flesh – 4:12
 Garden of the Gods – 4:52
 Towers of Silence – 4:21
 Voices in a Dream – 4:47
 The Forgotten Goddess – 4:48
 The Kingdom Within – 6:16
 Lost Beneath a Silent Sky – 4:28
 Circles in Stone – 4:56
 Adrift – 2:14

All songs composed and arranged by Brandon Patton, Kirk Carrison, Francine Boucher and Duane Cowan
Lyrics by Brandon Patton and Francine Boucher

Personnel

 Francine Boucher – vocals
 Brandon Patton – guitars
 Duane Cowan – bass
 Kirk Carrison – drums

Additional personnel

 Elizabeth Wright – cello (The Kingdom Within, Adrift)
 Robert Anderson – violin (The Kingdom Within, Adrift)

2007 debut albums
Nuclear Blast albums
Echoes of Eternity albums